Nuno Miguel Soares Pereira Ribeiro  (born 5 July 1976), known as Nuno Gomes, is a Portuguese former professional footballer who played as a striker.

He was given the nickname Gomes during childhood after Fernando Gomes, and was regarded one of the country's most recognisable attacking players in the 1990s and 2000s; he consistently scored for both club and country, and was also capable of being a good link-up player, accumulating a number of assists throughout his career, which was spent mainly with Benfica, for which he netted 166 goals in 398 games over the course of 12 seasons.

Gomes represented Portugal in two World Cups and three European Championships. He helped the national team finish second at Euro 2004 and third at Euro 2000, and won 79 senior caps.

Club career

Boavista / Benfica
Born in Amarante, Gomes established his reputation with Boavista FC, where he made his Primeira Liga debut in the 1994–95 season, aged 18. He collected his first silverware as his team beat S.L. Benfica to lift the Taça de Portugal in 1997, scoring a goal and winning a penalty kick in a 3–2 win in the final; he and fellow scorer Erwin Sánchez had already agreed to transfer to the opponents.

Gomes ranked joint-fourth top scorer in his last year at the Estádio do Bessa, before moving to Benfica. In the 1998–99 campaign he netted 34 times across all competitions, in an eventual third-place finish in the league.

Fiorentina
After three seasons at Benfica, in which he scored over 60 goals in over 100 appearances, his Euro 2000 exploits earned Gomes a €17 million move to ACF Fiorentina. He won the Coppa Italia over Parma F. C. in his first year, scoring in a 1–1 draw in the second leg of the final at home, which allowed his team to clinch the title 2–1 on aggregate; however, his second season was less successful, as financial collapse by the Viola and their subsequent relegation precipitated a 2002 return to his previous club on a four-year deal as a free agent.

Return to Benfica 
A series of nagging injuries limited Gomes to under 70 games from 2002 to 2005, but he still helped Benfica win the domestic cup in 2003–04 and the league the following season – in the latter, he contributed with seven goals from 23 appearances. He enjoyed his best season in 2005–06, scoring 15 goals in the league, including two in an away win over FC Porto (0–2) and a hat-trick against U.D. Leiria, finishing second in the scorers' list and adding the subsequent Supertaça Cândido de Oliveira, where he netted the game's only goal against Vitória de Setúbal.

From 2006–07 onwards, Gomes faced tough competition for a starting place in Benfica's attack: he only netted six times in the league, and would suffer even more after the signing of Paraguayan Óscar Cardozo the following summer. However, still a valuable member of the squad, he finished the campaign with nine overall goals, and was also made captain over legendary Rui Costa.

On 2 October 2008, Gomes scored his 150th goal for Benfica in a UEFA Cup game against S.S.C. Napoli (2–0 home win, 4–3 aggregate victory) with a fine header. Following the June 2009 signing of Argentine Javier Saviola, he further fell down in the striker pecking order.

Again a reserve player in 2010–11 – but playing even less – the 34-year-old Gomes made the most with the minutes provided to him by manager Jorge Jesus. He scored his first goal in the season on 14 November 2010 in a 4–0 home defeat of Associação Naval 1º de Maio, the 200th in the competition, and dedicated it to his father Joaquim who had died in August. In two consecutive league games in March 2011, he scored three goals, one at home against Portimonense SC (1–1 draw) and two in a 5–1 away rout of F.C. Paços de Ferreira, appearing as a late substitute in all three matches.

Braga
Gomes was released by Benfica on 30 June 2011, after the club decided not to renew his contract; he was, however, offered a position in the managerial structure, effective immediately or when he eventually retired. Shortly after, he signed with fellow league side S.C. Braga.

On 11 September 2011, Gomes scored a brace in a 3–1 home win against Gil Vicente FC. During his only season with the Minho team, he was mostly used as a backup.

Blackburn Rovers
On 3 July 2012, Gomes signed a two-year deal at Blackburn Rovers in the EFL Championship, becoming their third signing of the 2012–13 summer transfer window. On 18 August he made his league debut for his new club, against Ipswich Town, scoring his first goal the following round against Leicester City (2–1 home win).

On 28 June 2013, aged nearly 37, Gomes was released from his contract. After retiring, he was appointed director of Benfica's academy at Futebol Campus in Seixal, leaving his position in September 2017.

International career
Gomes represented Portugal at every level, earning 143 caps all categories comprised and scoring at an excellent rate overall. He helped the under-20s finish third in the 1995 FIFA World Youth Championship by netting four goals in as many games, including two in the third-place game against Spain; the following year he appeared at the 1996 Summer Olympics, helping to a fourth place.

Gomes made his senior international debut at 19, in a 1996 friendly against France. He scored his first goal in Portugal's opening match at the UEFA Euro 2000, marking his fourth start with the winner as the side came from two goals down to beat England 3–2. He would finish the competition with four goals as the national team reached the last four, but earned a seven-month international ban after pushing referee Günter Benkö following the semi-final defeat by France, in which he had opened the score; he was selected to the UEFA team of the tournament.

With seven goals in only six matches, Gomes helped Portugal qualify for the 2002 FIFA World Cup – this included a four-goal performance in a 7–1 away demolition of Andorra. He would struggle to hold a starting place in the finals in South Korea and Japan, only appearing twice from the bench; on 19 November 2003 he scored his second hat-trick, in only 21 minutes of play against Kuwait.

Things went better for Gomes at Euro 2004, where he played each game and, after coming on as a half-time substitute, scored the winning goal against Spain to send the hosts through to the quarter-finals. He was often injured during the nation's 2006 World Cup qualifying campaign, only managing to play four times, with one goal; he found limited time at the final stages and only made two appearances, but managed to find the back of the net with a header against hosts Germany in the third-place playoff, a 1–3 defeat.

After the retirement of Pauleta, Gomes was expected to become his successor in the striker role. He played ten matches and scored three times in Euro 2008's qualifying campaign, captained Portugal at the finals and scored against Germany in the quarter-finals, thus becoming the fourth player to score at three straight European Championships.

After the appointment of Carlos Queiroz as coach, Gomes was constantly left out of the squad due to his lack of minutes at his club. During the 2010 World Cup qualification, he only took part in four out of twelve matches, all as a substitute, with Liédson and Hugo Almeida being preferred; he was one of the 50 preliminary players but was left out of the 23-men squad for the final stages in South Africa, this being the first time the player was left out of a major tournament.

On 7 October 2011, after more than two years out of international play, 35-year-old Gomes replaced Hélder Postiga in the last minute of a 5–3 home victory over Iceland for the Euro 2012 qualifiers. Four days later, he played against Denmark in what was his last full appearance; due to little playing time for his club in 2011–12, he was left out of Paulo Bento's squad for the finals in Poland and Ukraine.

Personal life
Gomes' younger brother, Tiago (born 1981), was also a footballer and a striker. He spent most of his career in the lower leagues but, from 2004 to 2007, competed in the Segunda Liga with F.C. Marco (two seasons) and C.D. Olivais e Moscavide (one), amassing overall totals of 30 games and one goal.

Gomes was married twice, first to Isméria with whom he had a daughter, Laura, born in 1999. In July 2006 he married lawyer Patrícia Aguilar, with whom he also fathered another child, born in July 2010.

He was featured on the cover of the Portuguese edition of FIFA Football 2002.

Career statistics

Club

1 includes one match in the Italian Supercup.
2 includes one match and one goal in the Portuguese Supercup.

International

Scores and results list Portugal's goal tally first, score column indicates score after each Gomes goal.

Honours 
Boavista
Taça de Portugal: 1996–97

Fiorentina
Coppa Italia: 2000–01

Benfica
Primeira Liga: 2004–05, 2009–10
Taça de Portugal: 2003–04
Taça da Liga: 2008–09, 2009–10, 2010–11
Supertaça Cândido de Oliveira: 2005

Portugal
UEFA European Championship: Runner-up: 2004; 3rd place 2000
FIFA U-20 World Cup third place: 1995
UEFA European Under-18 Championship: 1994
Toulon Tournament (training match tournament) 3rd place: 1996

Individual
UEFA European Championship: Team of the Tournament: 2000
UEFA European Championship: Most goals in a knock-out phase for Portugal (3) 2000
UEFA European Championship: Most goals in knock-out phases for Portugal (4) 2000, 2008
Primeira Liga Player of the Year: 1998–99, 1999–2000
SJPF Player of the Month: September 2005, October 2005
Toulon Tournament (training match tournament) Top Scorer: 1996

Orders
 Medal of Merit, Order of the Immaculate Conception of Vila Viçosa (House of Braganza)

References

Further reading

External links

1976 births
Living people
People from Amarante, Portugal
Sportspeople from Porto District
Portuguese footballers
Association football forwards
Primeira Liga players
Boavista F.C. players
S.L. Benfica footballers
S.C. Braga players
Serie A players
ACF Fiorentina players
English Football League players
Blackburn Rovers F.C. players
Portugal youth international footballers
Portugal under-21 international footballers
Portugal international footballers
UEFA Euro 2000 players
2002 FIFA World Cup players
UEFA Euro 2004 players
2006 FIFA World Cup players
UEFA Euro 2008 players
Olympic footballers of Portugal
Footballers at the 1996 Summer Olympics
Portuguese expatriate footballers
Expatriate footballers in Italy
Expatriate footballers in England
Portuguese expatriate sportspeople in Italy
Portuguese expatriate sportspeople in England